Fuchs is an unincorporated community in Calaveras County, California. It lies at an elevation of 2467 feet (752 m).

References

External links

Unincorporated communities in California
Unincorporated communities in Calaveras County, California